The Essex and Suffolk Hunt is an English fox hunting pack founded in 1791.

History
The hunt is reputed to have been founded in 1791 by Sir William Rowley from a pack of hounds purchased from the Duke of York.  The pack was originally kenneled at Sir William's residence, Tendring Hall Park in Stoke-by-Nayland.  

In 1808 Mr Carrington Nunn succeeded Sir William as Master, remaining for about 50 years before handing over to his nephew Captain White, who moved the hounds to new kennels he built in Stratford St. Mary.

The kennels were moved to their current location in Layham during the Secord World War.

Hunt country
The hunt's country covers an area approximately 25 miles north to south and the same east to west, in Essex and Suffolk.

See also
 List of foxhound packs of the United Kingdom

References

Footnotes

Bibliography
 Baily’s hunting directory, Essex and Suffolk Hunt, retrieved 1 October 2016.
 Masters of Foxhounds Association, Essex and Suffolk Hunt, retrieved 1 October 2016.
 Essex and Suffolk Hunt website, retrieved 1 October 2016.

Fox hunts in the United Kingdom